Johannes Engebretsen Belsheim (21 January 1829 – 15 July 1909) was a Norwegian teacher, priest, translator and biographer.

Johannes Belsheim was born  in the village of Thorpegardane at Vang in Oppland. He attended Asker Seminary in Akershus. Belsheim took matriculation in 1858.  He attended Heltberg's school which prepared students for admission exams at the university and in 1861 he took his Degree in Theology. He was a teacher in Grue in Solør from 1856 and at Porsgrunn in Telemark during 1862. He served as rector of Vefsn teacher's college (Vefsn lærerskole) in Nordland during 1863. He was assigned as vicar in Sør-Varanger in 1864 and at Bjelland in Vest-Agder from 1870 to 1875.

As a writer, his topics covered several themes.  He is principally associated with his  studies of Biblical manuscripts, including the Codex Aureus, Codex Gigas, Codex Corbeiensis I, Codex Palatinus, Codex Veronensis, and Codex Claromontanus V. He also wrote a biography of Ivar Aasen.

Works 
 Codex aureus, sive quattuor evangelia ante Hieronymum Latine translata (1878)
 Palimpsestus vindobonensis antiqvissimae veteris testamenti: translationis Latinae fragmenta (1885)
 Das Evangelium des Markus, Christiana Videnskabs-Selskabs Forhandlinger 9 (Christiana, 1885).
 Evangelium secundum Matthaeum,  Christiania 1892
 Evangelium palatinum: reliqvias IV Evangeliorum ante Hieronymum latine (1896)
Ivar Aasen. En Levnetsskildring  (1901)
 Codex veronensis; quattuor Euangelia ante Hieronymum latine translata eruta & codice scripto ut videtur saeculo quarto vel quinto in Bibliotheca episcopali veronensi asservato et ex Josephi Blanchini editione principe (Pragae 1904)

References

External links 
 

1829 births
1909 deaths
People from Vang, Oppland
19th-century Norwegian Lutheran clergy
Norwegian translators
Norwegian biographers
Male biographers
Burials at the Cemetery of Our Saviour
19th-century translators
19th-century Norwegian male writers